Jebi may refer to:
Typhoon Jebi
Jebi Sports Club
Jebi Mather
Jebi Mather Hisham